Sri Lanka is a tropical island situated close to the southern tip of India. The invertebrate fauna is as large as it is common to other regions of the world. There are about 2 million species of arthropods found in the world, and still it is counting. So many new species are discover up to this time also. So it is very complicated and difficult to summarize the exact number of species found within a certain region.

This a list of the dipterans found from Sri Lanka.

Fly
Phylum: Arthropoda   Class: Insecta
Order: Diptera

Diptera is a large order containing an estimated 1,000,000 species of mosquitoes, horseflies,

Mosquitoes (Culicidae) are vectors for malaria, dengue, West Nile virus, yellow fever, encephalitis, and other infectious diseases. Houseflies spread food-borne illnesses. Larger flies such as tsetse fly and screwworm cause significant economic harm to cattle. Well over 3,500 species of mosquitoes were found and described, and new species are about to discover. Sri Lanka is home to 131 species of mosquitoes that included to 16 genera with 17 endemic species.

Blowfly larvae, known as gentles, and other dipteran larvae, known more generally as maggots, are used as fishing bait and as food for carnivorous animals. In medical debridement, wounds are cleaned using maggots.

The exact number of species confined to the country is very difficult to note down, due to few researchers and publications of papers focusing them. Most of the cited references are from way back in 1900s, and very few are from 2010 revisions. In 2020, two stalk-eyed flies were described from Pundaluoya and Udawattakele.

There are more than 1,341 dipterans found in the island, which earns fourth largest insect order found.

Family: Acroceridae - Spider flies
Astomella jardinei
Lasia spinosa
Ogcodes angustimarginatus
Ogcodes rufomarginatus 
Pialea jardinei

Family: Agromyzidae - Leaf-miner flies

Agromyza ceylonensis
Agromyza solita 
Amauromyza flavida 
Amauromyza meridionalis
Cerodontha incisa 
Cerodontha oryzivora 
Cerodontha piliseta 
Japanagromyza perplexa 
Japanagromyza tristella 
Liriomyza brassicae
Liriomyza huidobrensis
Liriomyza pusilla 
Liriomyza sativae 
Melanagromyza albisquama 
Melanagromyza atomella 
Melanagromyza cleomae 
Melanagromyza hibisci 
Melanagromyza obtusa 
Melanagromyza pubiseta 
Melanagromyza rotata 
Melanagromyza sojae 
Ophiomyia aberrans 
Ophiomyia atralis 
Ophiomyia conspicua 
Ophiomyia lantanae
Ophiomyia phaseoli  
Phytoliriomyza arctica 
Phytoliriomyza australensis
Phytoliriomyza nigriantennalis
Phytoliriomyza rangalensis
Phytomyza ceylonensis 
Phytomyza syngenesiae
Pseudonapomyza asiatica 
Pseudonapomyza gujaratica 
Pseudonapomyza quatei 
Tropicomyia polyphaga 
Tropicomyia theae

Family: Anisopodidae - Wood gnats
Olbiogaster fulviventris
Olbiogaster orientalis 
Olbiogaster zeylanicus
Sylvicola foveatus
Sylvicola maculipennis

Family: Anthomyiidae - Root-maggot flies
Emmesomyia kempi

Family: Asilidae - Robber flies

Astochia annulipes
Astochia ceylonicus
Astochia determinatus
Astochia grisea
Astochia tarsalis 
Chrysopogon nodulibarbis
Chrysopogon serrulatus
Chrysopogon zizanioides
Clephydroneura annulatus
Clephydroneura apicalis
Clinopogon odontoferus
Cophinopoda chinensis
Damalis felderi
Damalis fulvipes 
Damalis infuscata
Damalis kassebeeri
Dasophrys coetzeei
Emphysomera femorata
Emphysomera nigra
Euscelidia flava 
Euscelidia prolata
Euscelidia simplex
Eutolmus ohirai 
Heligmoneura pulcher
Heteropogon triticeus 
Laphystia stigmaticallis
Machimus parvus 
Michotamia aurata
Michotamia deceptus
Microstylum rufoabdominalis
Microstylum whitei
Neoitamus ceylonicus
Neoitamus pulcher
Neoitamus tarsalis
Neomochtherus gnavus 
Nusa yerburyi 
Pegesimallus srilankensis
Pegesimallus yerburyi
Philodicus ceylanicus
Philodicus chinensis
Philodicus hospes
Philodicus meridionalis
Philodicus thoracinus 
Promachus ceylanicus 
Promachus pseudomaculatus
Promachus yerburiensis
Saropogon maculipennis
Saropogon srilankaensis
Scleropogon piceus
Stenopogon piceus
Stenopogon variabilis

Family: Asteiidae - Asteiid flies
Asteia pusillima

Family: Athericidae - Ibis flies
Atherix labiate
Suragina elegans
Suragina labiata
Suragina uruma

Family: Blephariceridae - Net-winged midges
Hammatorrhina bella
Hammatorrhina pulchra

Family: Bombyliidae - Bee flies

Anthrax ceylonica
Anthrax distigma
Anthrax semifuscatus
Bombylisoma resplendens
Bombylius ardens
Bombylius brunettii
Bombylius dives
Bombylius maculatus
Bombylius propinquus
Dischistus resplendens
Euchariomyia dives
Exoprosopa affinissima
Exoprosopa bengalensis
Exoprosopa brahma
Exoprosopa flammea
Exoprosopa ghilarovi
Exoprosopa insulata
Exoprosopa niveiventris
Exoprosopa punjabensis
Exoprosopa stylata
Exoprosopa tursonovi
Geron argentifrons
Heteralonia neurospila
Exoprosopa affinissima
Ligyra semifuscata
Ligyra sphinx
Litorhina lar
Micomitra vitripennis
Petrorossia brunettii
Petrorossia ceylonica
Petrorossia intermedia
Petrorossia talawila
Systoechus eupogonatus
Systoechus socius
Systoechus srilankae
Thyridanthrax absalon
Thyridanthrax keiseri
Villa approximata
Villa fletcheri

Family: Bibionidae - March flies
Plecia malayaensis
Plecia mallochi
Plecia rufilatera

Family: Calliphoridae - Blow flies

Bengalia bezzii
Bengalia fuscipennis 
Bengalia hastativentris
Bengalia jejuna 
Bengalia obscuripennis
Bengalia torosa 
Borbororhinia bivittata 
Caiusa testacea
Chrysomya megacephala
Chrysomya nigripes 
Chrysomya pinguis 
Chrysomya rufifacies 
Chrysomya villeneuvi
Cosmina simplex 
Hemipyrellia ligurriens
Idiella divisa
Idiella euidielloides
Idiella mandarina 
Isomyia fulvicornis 
Isomyia pseudonepalana
Isomyia pseudoviridana
Isomyia sinharaja 
Isomyia versicolor 
Isomyia yerburyi
Isomyia zeylanica 
Lucilia caesia
Lucilia obesa
Lucilia porphyrina  
Metallea clausa 
Metallea flavibasis
Metallea major 
Metallea notata 
Onesia danielssoni
Onesia kamimurai 
Onesia lanka 
Phumosia indica
Phumosia testacea
Polleniopsis nigripalpis
Polleniopsis zaitzevi 
Rhinia apicalis
Rhinia melastoma 
Rhyncomya currani 
Rhyncomya divisa 
Stomorhina cincta 
Stomorhina discolor 
Stomorhina lunata 
Stomorhina nigripes 
Strongyloneura prolata 
Tainanina pilisquama
Tainanina sarcophagoides 
Thoracites abdominalis 
Thoracites miltogrammoides

Family: Canacidae - Surge flies
Chaetocanace brincki
Dasyrhicnoessa fulva 
Dasyrhicnoessa vockerothi 
Horaismoptera hennigi 
Nocticanace taprobane 
Procanace grisescens 
Pseudorhicnoessa rattii
Xanthocanace zeylanica

Family: Cecidomyiidae - Gall midges

Androdiplosis coccidivora - monotyoic endemic
Arthrocnodax rutherfordi 
Arthrocnodax walkeriana 
Bryocrypta girafa
Calopedila polyalthiae
Cecidomyiidi generosi
Cecidomyiidi hirta
Chrysodiplosis squamatipes
Clinodiplosis ceylonica
Coccomyza donaldi
Dentifibula obtusilobae
Diadiplosis coccidivora
Didactylomyia ceylanica 
Diplecus inconspicuus - monotypic endemic
Endaphis hirta 
Feltiella acarisuga
Hallomyia iris
Lasioptera aeschynanthusperottetti 
Lestodiplosis ceylanica
Lestremia ceylanica
Misocosmus ceylanicus - monotypic endemic
Mycodiplosis simulacri 
Mycodiplosis simulaeri
Orseolia ceylanica
Orseolia ceylonica
Plutodiplosis maginifica 
Plutodiplosis magnifica
Pseudoperomyia parvolobata 
Trichoperrisia pipericola - monotypic endemic
Vanchidiplosis ceylanica
Xylodiplosis aestivalis

Family: Celyphidae - Beetle flies
Celyphus anisotomoides
Celyphus hyalinus 
Celyphus obtectus 
Spaniocelyphus bigoti 
Spaniocelyphus cognatus

Family: Ceratopogonidae - Biting midges
Alluaudomyia marginalis
Alluaudomyia spinosipes
Alluaudomyia xanthocoma
Alluaudomyia bifurcata
Alluaudomyia formosana
Alluaudomyia fuscipes
Alluaudomyia maculosipennis
Atrichopogon schizonyx
Parabezzia orientalis

Family: Chamaemyiidae - Silver flies
Acrometopia reicherti
Leucopis luteicornis

Family: Chaoboridae - Phantom midges
Chaoborus asiaticus 
Corethrella inepta

Family: Chironomidae - Nonbiting midges

Ablabesmyia annulatipes
Cardiocladius ceylanicus 
Chironomini albiforceps 
Chironomini ceylanicus
Chironomini striatipennis 
Chironomus allothrix
Chironomus chlogaster 
Chironomus elatus 
Chironomus gloriosus 
Chironomus heptatomus 
Chironomus hexatomus 
Chironomus laminatus 
Chironomus perichlorus 
Chironomus pretiosus 
Chironomus sumptuosus 
Chironomus superbus 
Chironomus variicornis 
Clinotanypus ceylanicus 
Clinotanypus ornatissimus
Clinotanypus variegatus 
Nilodorum biroi 
Nilodorum tainanus 
Orthocladiinae ceylanicus
Polypedilum nubifer 
Tanypus pallidipes 
Tanytarsini prasiogaster 
Tanytarsini transversalis
Tanytarsus ceylanicus 
Tanytarsus lobatus 
Tanytarsus poecilus

Family: Chloropidae - Eye flies

Anatrichus pygmaeus
Anthracophagella albovariegata
Anthracophagella sulcifrons
Arcuator horni 
Cadrema bilineata 
Cadrema colombensis 
Cadrema minor 
Cadrema ocellata 
Cestoplectus intuens 
Chlorops laevifrons 
Chlorops lutheri 
Chlorops quadrilineata 
Chlorops zeylanicus 
Chloropsina brunnescens
Chloropsina lacreiventris 
Conioscinella humeralis 
Dactylothyrea hyalipennis
Dactylothyrea spinipes 
Elachiptera indistincta 
Ensiferella ceylonica 
Ensiferella obscurella 
Eutropha flavomaculata 
Eutropha siphloidea 
Gampsocera grandis 
Gampsocera mutata 
Lasiopleura fulvitarsis 
Lasiopleura zeylanica 
Meijerella inaequalis 
Merochlorops ceylanicus 
Myrmecosepsis taprobane 
Pachylophus rufescens 
Parectecephala indica 
Polyodaspis flavipila 
Polyodaspis ruficornis 
Pseudeurina maculata 
Rhodesiella ceylonica 
Rhodesiella foveata 
Rhodesiella nana 
Rhodesiella planiscutellata 
Rhodesiella sanctijohani 
Rhodesiella sauteri 
Rhodesiella scutellata 
Rhodesiella tibiella 
Scoliophthalmus micans 
Semaranga dorsocentralis 
Sepsidoscinis maculipennis
Siphlus vittatus 
Siphonellopsina kokagalensis  
Siphunculina funicola
Siphunculina intonsa
Thaumatomyia semicolon

Family: Clusiidae - Druid flies
Czernyola sasakawai
Phylloclusia lanceola

Family: Conopidae - Thick-headed flies
Conops ceylonicus 
Conops keiseri 
Conops nubeculosus 
Physocephala aurantiaca 
Physocephala diffusa 
Physocephala limbipennis 
Physocephala tenella 
Pleurocerinella dioctriaeformis
Pleurocerinella srilankai
Stylogaster orientalis

Family: Cryptochetidae 
Cryptochetum curtipenne

Family: Cypselosomatidae 
Formicosepsis brincki

Family: Culicidae - Mosquitoes

Family: Curtonotidae - Quasimodo flies
Axinota sarawakensis
Axinota simulans
Curtonotum ceylonense

Family: Diopsidae - Stalk-eyed flies
Pseudodiopsis bipunctipennis
Teleopsis ferruginea 
Teleopsis krombeini 
Teleopsis maculata 
Teleopsis neglecta 
Teleopsis rubicunda
Teleopsis sorora

Family: Dixidae - Meniscus midges
Dixa zeylanica

Family: Dolichopodidae - Long-legged flies

Amblypsilopus bruneli
Amblypsilopus munroi
Argyrochlamys impudicus
Campsicnemus crossotibia
Chrysosoma annotatum
Chrysosoma appendiculatum
Chrysosoma armillatum
Chrysosoma congruens
Chrysosoma cupido
Chrysosoma derisior
Chrysosoma duplicatum
Chrysosoma excisum
Chrysosoma extractum
Chrysosoma fasciatum
Chrysosoma infirme
Chrysosoma kandyensis
Chrysosoma ovale
Chrysosoma palapes
Chrysosoma pallidum
Chrysosoma petulans
Chrysosoma pulcherrimum
Chrysosoma pusilum
Chrysosoma shentorea
Chrysosoma vittatum
Chrysotus degener
Condylostylus impar
Condylostylus lutheri
Condylostylus setifer
Diaphorus detectus
Diaphorus maurus
Diaphorus nigerrimus
Diaphorus rostratus
Diaphorus simulans
Diaphorus vagans
Dolichopodinae torquata
Dolichopus hirsutisetis
Hydrophorus geminus
Lichtwardtia ziczac
Medetera austroapicalis
Medetera chandleri
Medetera grisecens
Megistostylus longicornis 
Mesorhaga breviapendiculata
Mesorhaga breviappendiculata
Mesorhaga mellavana
Mesorhaga nigrobarbata
Mesorhaga nigroviridis
Mesorhaga obscura
Mesorhaga pseudolata
Mesorhaga terminalis
Neurigona denudata
Neurigona exemta
Paraclius adligatus
Paraclius albimanus
Paraclius callosus
Paraclius luculentus
Paraclius maritimus
Paraclius paraguayensis
Paraclius trisetosus
Paraclius viridus
Pelastoneurus aequalis
Pelastoneurus crassinervis
Pelastoneurus potomacus 
Plagiozopelma santense 
Sciapus aequalis
Sciapus rectus 
Sciapus viridicollis
Sympycnus albipes 
Sympycnus maculatus 
Sympycnus strenuus 
Sympycnus turbidus 
Syntormon edwardsi
Tachytrechus tessellatus 
Urodolichus keiseri

Family: Drosophilidae - Fruit flies

Amiota magna
Amiota subradiata
Cacoxenus asiatica 
Colocasiomyia minor
Colocasiomyia nigripennis
Colocasiomyia zeylanica 
Chymomyza rufithorax
Chymomyza pararufithorax
Chymomyza flagellata
Chymomyza formosana
Chymomyza brevis
Chymomyza cinctifrons
Chymomyza cirricauda
Chymomyza constricta
Chymomyza cyanea
Crincosia gugorum
Dettopsomyia formosa
Dettopsomyia jacobsoni
Dettopsomyia preciosa 
Dettopsomyia zeylanica
Diathoneura preciosa
Dichaetophora cirricauda
Dichaetophora constricta
Dichaetophora cyanea
Dichaetophora fascifrons
Dichaetophora nigrifrons
Dichaetophora paraserrata
Dichaetophora quadrifrons
Drosophila melanogaster
Drosophila chandleri
Hirtodrosophila chandleri
Hirtodrosophila seminigra
Hirtodrosophila trivittata
Hypselothyrea varanasiensis
Laccodrosophila atra 
Leucophenga abbreviata
Leucophenga acutipollinosa
Leucophenga albofasciata
Leucophenga angusta
Leucophenga argentata
Leucophenga atrinervis
Leucophenga bellula
Leucophenga digmasoma
Leucophenga flavicosta
Leucophenga interrupta
Leucophenga jacobsoni
Leucophenga limbipennis
Leucophenga lynettae
Leucophenga maculata
Leucophenga meijerei
Leucophenga nigripalpis
Leucophenga nigroscutellata
Leucophenga pectinata
Leucophenga quadripunctata
Leucophenga setipalpis 
Leucophenga subpollinosa
Leucophenga umbratula
Liodrosophila actinia
Liodrosophila ceylonica
Liodrosophila crescens
Liodrosophila globosa
Liodrosophila ornata 
Liodrosophila varians
Lissocephala metallescens 
Lordiphosa nigrostyla
Lordiphosa spinopenicula
Microdrosophila bullata
Microdrosophila conica 
Microdrosophila elongata
Microdrosophila filamentea
Microdrosophila furcata 
Microdrosophila macroctenia
Microdrosophila matsudairai 
Microdrosophila nigrispina
Microdrosophila pleurolineata
Microdrosophila sarawakana 
Microdrosophila tectifrons 
Mulgravea asiatica
Mulgravea vittata 
Mycodrosophila alienata 
Mycodrosophila amabilis
Mycodrosophila aqua
Mycodrosophila ciliophora 
Mycodrosophila gordoni 
Mycodrosophila gratiosa
Mycodrosophila parallelinervis 
Paramycodrosophila pictula
Pararhinoleucophenga maura
Phortica foliiseta
Phortica xyleboriphaga
Phorticella bistriata 
Scaptodrosophila anderssoni
Scaptodrosophila brincki
Scaptodrosophila cederholmi
Scaptodrosophila coniura
Scaptodrosophila excavata
Scaptodrosophila nigrescens
Scaptodrosophila subminima
Scaptomyza bipars
Scaptomyza brachycerca
Scaptomyza clavifera
Scaptomyza devexa
Scaptomyza elmoi
Scaptomyza salvadorae 
Sphaerogastrella javana
Stegana castanea
Stegana lateralis 
Stegana nigrifrons
Stegana subconvergens
Tambourella sphaerogaster 
Zaprionus sepsoides
Zapriothrica hirta
Zapriothrica nudiseta 
Zygothrica flavociliata 
Zygothrica fuscina
Zygothrica vittinubila

Family: Empididae - Balloon flies
Empis carbonaria
Empis ceylonica
Hilarempis neptunus
Wiedemannia submarina

Family: Ephydridae - Shore flies

Actocetor nigrifinis
Ceropsilopa cupreiventris
Ceropsilopa decussata
Chlorichaeta orba
Chlorichaeta tuberculosa
Clasiopella uncinata
Discocerina obscurella
Discomyza maculipennis
Dryxo brahma
Dryxo lispoidea
Hecamede granifera
Hecamedoides hepatica
Hydrellia griseola
Hydrellia latipalpis
Lamproclasiopa biseta
Leptopsilopa pollinosa
Notiphila bipunctata
Notiphila dorsopunctata
Notiphila indistincta
Notiphila philippinensis
Notiphila puberula
Notiphila puncta
Notiphila simalurensis
Rhynchopsilopa ceylonensis
Paralimna hirticornis
Paralimna javana
Paralimna lineata
Paralimna picta
Paralimna quadrifascia
Placopsidella phaeonota
Polytrichophora brunneifrons
Psilopa flavimanus
Rhynchopsilopa ceylonensis

Family: Fanniidae - Little house flies
Euryomma peregrinum 
Fannia canicularis

Family: Hippoboscidae - Louse flies
Ascodipteron emballonurae
Brachytarsina cucullata
Brachytarsina modesta
Brachytarsina pygialis
Brachytarsina speiseri
Hippobosca longipennis
Hippobosca variegata
Lipoptena axis 
Lipoptena efovea
Lynchia corvina
Lynchia longipalpis
Myophthiria reduvioides
Myophthiria zeylanica
Ornithoctona plicata
Ornithoica curvata
Raymondia pagodarum

Family: Hybotidae - Dance flies

Bicellaria bisetosa 
Drapetis abdominenotata
Drapetis basalis
Drapetis distincta
Drapetis fulvithorax
Drapetis metatarsata
Drapetis nigropunctata
Drapetis notatithorax
Drapetis plumicornis 
Elaphropeza distincta
Elaphropeza pollicata
Hybos apicis 
Hybos bistosus
Hybos geniculatus 
Parahybos luteicornis 
Parahybos maculithorax 
Platypalpus ceylonensis 
Platypalpus zelanica 
Stilpon divergens 
Syndyas jovis 
Syndyas parvicellulata 
Syneches bigoti
Syneches fuscipennis 
Syneches helvolus
Syneches immaculatus
Syneches jardinei
Syneches maculithorax
Syneches minutus
Syneches peradeniyae 
Syneches signatus
Syneches singatus
Syneches varipes
Trichina ceylonica

Family: Lauxaniidae

Cerataulina boettcheri 
Chaetolauxania sulphuriceps
Drepanephora horrida 
Homoneura bistriata 
Homoneura crassicauda 
Homoneura curta 
Homoneura intereuns 
Homoneura leucoprosopon 
Homoneura lucida 
Homoneura ornatipennis 
Homoneura sauteri 
Homoneura spiculata 
Homoneura trypetoptera 
Homoneura yerburyi 
Pachycerina javana 
Phobeticomyia lunifera 
Poecilolycia vittata 
Steganopsis fuscipennis 
Steganopsis multilineata 
Steganopsis pupicola 
Steganopsis tripunctata 
Trigonometopus zeylanicus

Family: Keroplatidae - Fungus gnats

Burmacrocera minuta - monotypic genus
Heteropterna fenestralis
Isoneuromyia annandalei 
Keroplatus notaticoxa 
Laurypta tripunctata 
Macrocera fryeri
Orfelia bibula
Orfelia negotiosa
Orfelia saeva
Orfelia ventosa
Platyceridion edax - endemic genus
Platyceridion talaroceroides
Platyura fumipes
Platyura juxta
Platyura lunifrons
Platyura minuta 
Platyura tripunctata
Proceroplatus poecilopterus
Proceroplatus pulchripennis
Rutylapa juxta 
Srilankana mirabilis - monotypic endemic
Truplaya fumipes 
Xenoplatyura lunifrons

Family: Limoniidae - Limoniid crane flies

Antocha salikensis 
Baeoura pollicis 
Baeoura taprobanes
Baeoura triquetra
Conosia irrorata
Conosia minuscula
Dicranomyia guttula
Dicranomyia ravana
Dicranomyia rectidens
Dicranomyia saltens
Dicranomyia sielediva
Dicranomyia sordida
Dicranomyia tipulipes
Dolichopeza flavicans
Dolichopeza guttulanalis
Dolichopeza palifera
Dolichopeza singhalica
Ellipteroides pictilis
Ellipteroides rohuna
Ellipteroides thiasodes
Epiphragma kempi
Erioptera incompleta
Erioptera notate
Erioptera orbitalis
Eupilaria singhalica
Eupilaria taprobanica
Eupilaria thysanotos
Geranomyia circipunctata
Geranomyia circipunctata
Geranomyia genitaloides
Geranomyia gracilispinosa
Geranomyia genitaloides
Gonomyia conjugens
Gonomyia hedys
Gonomyia lanka
Gonomyia persimilis
Gonomyia runa
Gonomyia serendibensis
Gymnastes maya
Gymnastes simhalae
Gymnastes violaceus
Hexatoma albonotata - subsp. citrocastanea
Hexatoma badia
Hexatoma crystalloptera
Hexatoma ctenophoroides - subsp. ctenophoroides, nigrithorax
Hexatoma fusca
Hexatoma greenii
Hexatoma humberti
Hexatoma meleagris
Hexatoma neopaenulata
Hexatoma ochripleuris
Hexatoma pachyrrhina
Hexatoma pachyrrhinoides
Hexatoma scutellata
Hexatoma serendib
Hexatoma subnitens
Hexatoma tuberculifera
Hexatoma yerburyi
Idiocera conchiformis
Idiocera persimilis
Libnotes greeni
Libnotes immaculipennis
Libnotes notata
Libnotes palaeta
Libnotes poeciloptera
Libnotes thwaitesiana
Limonia albipes
Limonia annulata
Limonia ayodhya
Limonia chaseni
Limonia latiorflava
Limonia longivena
Limonia ravida
Limonia vibhishana
Molophilus hylandensis
Molophilus rachius
Molophilus veddah
Molophilus wejaya
Molophilus yakkho
Orimarga asignata
Orimarga taprobanica
Paradelphomyia indulcata
Paradelphomyia subterminalis
Polymera zeylanica 
Prionota serraticornis
Pseudolimnophila zelanica
Rhabdomastix schmidiana
Rhipidia subtesselata
Styringomyia ceylonica
Styringomyia flava
Styringomyia fryeri 
Styringomyia marmorata
Tasiocerellus kandyensis - endemic genus
Teucholabis angusticapitis
Teucholabis annuloabdominalis
Teucholabis fenestrata
Teucholabis ornata
Thrypticomyia apicalis
Toxorhina yamma
Trentepohlia nigroapicalis
Trentepohlia pennipes
Trentepohlia speiseri
Trentepohlia tenera
Trentepohlia trentepohlii

Family: Lonchaeidae - Lance flies
Lamprolonchaea pipinna
Lonchaea incisurata 
Lonchaea minuta 
Silba abstata 
Silba admirabilis
Silba excisa 
Silba perplexa 
Silba pollinosa 
Silba setifera 
Silba srilanka

Family: Lygistorrhinidae
Lygistorrhina asiatica

Family: Micropezidae - Stilt-legged flies
Grammicomyia ferrugata
Grammicomyia testacea 
Mimegralla nietneri 
Mimegralla splendens

Family: Milichiidae - Freeloader flies
Desmometopa inaurata 
Desmometopa kandyensis 
Desmometopa srilankae 
Phyllomyza aelleni

Family: Muscidae - House flies

Atherigona atripalpis
Atherigona bella
Atherigona confusa
Atherigona exigua
Atherigona falcata
Atherigona gamma
Atherigona laeta
Atherigona lamda
Atherigona maculigera 
Atherigona naquvii 
Atherigona naqvii 
Atherigona orientalis
Atherigona oryzae
Atherigona pulla
Atherigona punctata
Atherigona reversura
Atherigona simplex
Caricea tinctipennis
Cephalispa lata
Cephalispa mira
Cephalispa capitulata
Dichaetomyia acrostichalis
Dichaetomyia apicalis
Dichaetomyia curvimedia
Dichaetomyia fumaria
Dichaetomyia handschini
Dichaetomyia holoxantha
Dichaetomyia keiseri
Dichaetomyia manca
Dichaetomyia melanotela
Dichaetomyia pallidorsis
Dichaetomyia seniorwhitei
Dichaetomyia splendida
Dichaetomyia tamil
Graphomya adumbrata
Graphomya atripes
Graphomya rufitibia
Gymnodia ascendens
Gymnodia distincta
Haematobia minuta
Haematobosca sanguinolenta
Hebecnema nigra
Hebecnema nigrithorax
Helina fuscisquama
Helina nervosa
Heliographa ceylanica
Hydrotaea australis
Hydrotaea jacobsoni
Limnophora albonigra
Limnophora himalayensis
Limnophora prominens
Limnophora tinctipennis
Lispe bengalensis
Lispe binotata
Lispe flavicornis
Lispe incerta
Lispe kowarzi
Lispe mirabilis
Lispe sericipalpis
Lispocephala tinctipennis
Mitroplatia albisquama
Morellia albisquama
Morellia biseta
Morellia hortensia
Morellia pectinipes
Morellia quadriremis
Morellia sordidisquama
Musca cassara
Musca conducens
Musca confiscata
Musca convexifrons
Musca craggi
Musca crassirostris
Musca domestica
Musca fletcheri
Musca formosana
Musca hervei
Musca inferior
Musca pattoni
Musca planiceps
Musca seniorwhitei
Musca ventrosa
Mydaea diaphana
Mydaea fuscisquama
Mydaea morosa
Mydaea nervosa
Mydaea pallens 
Mydaea splendida 
Mydaea tuberculifacies 
Myospila argentata
Myospila femorata
Myospila laveis
Myospila morosa
Myospila ruficollis
Neomyia claripennis
Neomyia coeruleifrons
Neomyia diffidens
Neomyia fletcheri
Neomyia gavisa
Neomyia indica 
Neomyia lauta
Neomyia steini
Neomyia stella
Neomyia timorensis 
Ophyra spinigera
Phaonia auricoxa
Phaonia caeruleicolor
Pygophora hopkinsi
Pygophora immaculipennis
Pygophora keiseri
Pygophora lutescens 
Pygophora macularis
Pygophora microchaeta  
Pygophora nigricauda
Pygophora plumifera
Pygophora xanthogaster 
Rhynchomydaea tuberculifacies
Stomoxys indicus
Stomoxys plurinotata
Stomoxys sitiens 
Tamilomyia dichaetomyiina

Family: Mycetophilidae - Fungus gnats

Acnemia asiatica
Allodia varicornis 
Aneura pinguis 
Anomalomyia affinis - endemic genus
Anomalomyia basalis 
Anomalomyia flavicauda 
Anomalomyia guttata 
Anomalomyia immaculata 
Anomalomyia intermedia 
Anomalomyia minor 
Anomalomyia nasuta 
Anomalomyia obscura 
Anomalomyia picta 
Anomalomyia subobscura 
Anomalomyia thompsoni 
Anomalomyia viatoris
Anthracophaga sulcifrons
Azana asiatica
Boraceomyia cajuensis
Boraceomyia paulistensis
Brevicornu callidum
Clastobasis fugitiva
Clastobasis lepida
Docosia caniripes
Dziedzickia basalis
Epicypta bilunulata
Epicypta ferruginea
Epicypta flavohirta
Epicypta nigroflava
Epicypta pectenipes
Epicypta setosiventris
Exechia albicincta
Exechia ampullata
Exechia argenteofasciata
Exechia boracensis
Exechia cristata 
Exechia cristatoides 
Exechia paramirastoma 
Exechia zeylanica
Exechiopsis bifida
Greenomyia fugitiva
Greenomyia lepida 
Clastobasis fugitiva
Clastobasis lepida
Leia annulicornis
Leia arcuata
Manota orientalis 
Manota sespinaea
Neoempheria bifascipennis 
Neoempheria unifascipennis 
Zygomyia valepedro

Family: Mydidae - Mydas flies
Leptomydas notos

Family: Nemestrinidae - Tangle-veined flies
Atriadops javana
Ceyloniola magnifica - monotypic endemic genus
Hirmoneura brunnea
Hirmoneura coffeata

Family: Neriidae - Stilt-legged flies
Chaetonerius comperei 
Gymnonerius ceylanicus 
Telostylus latibrachium

Family: Nycteribiidae - Bat flies
Basilia amiculata
Basilia eileenae 
Basilia pumila
Basilia punctata
Cyclopodia sykesii
Eucampsipoda latisternum 
Leptocyclopodia ferrarii
Nycteribia allotopa
Penicillidia indica
Phthiridium ceylonicum
Phthiridium phillipsi

Family: Pachyneuridae
Haruka elegans

Family: Periscelididae
Stenomicra fascipennis

Family: Phoridae - Scuttle flies

Ceylonoxenia bugnioni 
Ceylonoxenia butteli
Clitelloxenia clitellaria
Clitelloxenia paradeniyae
Diplonevra ater
Diplonevra cinctiventris
Megaselia achatinae
Megaselia argiopephaga
Megaselia bowlesi
Megaselia deningi
Megaselia hepworthae
Megaselia pseudoscalaris
Megaselia reynoldsi
Megaselia robinsoni
Puliciphora trisclerita
Rhynchomicropteron puliciforme
Spiniphora conspicua

Family: Pipunculidae - Big-headed flies
Cephalops magnimembrus
Eudorylas angustipennis
Eudorylas beckeri
Eudorylas biroi
Tomosvaryella aeneiventris
Tomosvaryella singalensis

Family: Platypezidae - Flat-footed flies
Lindneromyia brunettii 
Lindneromyia cirrhocera
Lindneromyia curta 
Lindneromyia kandyi 
Microsania lanka 
Platypeza brunettii
Platypeza nepalensis
Polyporivora nepalensis

Family: Platystomatidae - Signal flies

Elassogaster linearis
Euprosopia dorsata
Euprosopia latifrons
Euprosopia nigropunctata
Euprosopia planiceps
Euprosopia platystomoides
Lamprophthalma felderi
Plagiostenopterina cinctaria
Plagiostenopterina dubiosa
Plagiostenopterina fasciata
Plagiostenopterina rufa
Pseudepicausta angulata
Pterogenia niveitarsis
Rivellia costalis
Rivellia eximia
Rivellia frugalis
Rivellia furcata
Rivellia fusca
Rivellia herinella

Family: Psilidae - Rust flies
Chyliza cylindrica 
Chyliza pseudomunda 
Loxocera brevibuccata 
Loxocera insolita 
Sargus decorus 
Sargus metallinus

Family: Psychodidae - Moth flies

Brunettia albohumeralis
Brunettia albonotata
Brunettia atrisquamis
Brunettia uzeli
Clogmia albipunctata 
Neotelmatoscopus acutus
Neotelmatoscopus rotundus
Phlebotomus argentipes
Phlebotomus annandalei
Phlebotomus glaucus
Phlebotomus stantoni
Psychoda acanthostyla
Psychoda alabangensis
Psychoda aponensos
Psychoda formosana
Psychoda geniculata
Psychoda maculipennis
Psychoda mediocris
Psychoda vagabunda
Sergentomyia arboris
Sergentomyia insularis
Telmatoscopus flavicollis
Telmatoscopus proximus

Family: Pyrgotidae - Picture-winged flies
Peltodasia magnicornis 
Peltodesia magnicornis 
Taeniomastix pictiventris 
Taeniomastix unicolor

Family: Rhagionidae - Snipe flies
Chrysopilus latus 
Chrysopilus magnipennis 
Chrysopilus opalescens 
Chrysopilus similis 
Chrysopilus yerburyi

Family: Rhiniidae 
Metallea clausa

Family: Rhinophoridae - Woodlouse flies
Ptilocera fastuosa
Ptilocera smaragdifera

Family: Sarcophagidae - Flesh flies

Amobia auriceps
Apodacra ceylonica
Dolichotachina melanura
Eremasiomyia orientalis
Heteronychia calicifera
Hoplacephala asiatica
Hoplacephala mirabilis
Krombeinomyia mirabilis
Metopia argyrocephala
Metopia nudibasis 
Phyllarista rohdendorfi
Phylloteles argyrozoster
Phylloteles ballucapitatus
Phylloteles longiunguis
Phylloteles rohdendorfi
Protomiltogramma nandii
Protomiltogramma seniorwhitei
Pterella krombeini
Sarcophaga alba
Sarcophaga annandalei
Sarcophaga futilis
Sarcophaga henryi 
Sarcophaga kempi
Sarcophaga martellata
Sarcophaga martellatoides
Sarcophaga peregrina 
Sarcophaga scopariiformis
Sarcophaga talonata
Sarcophaga zaitzevi
Thereomyia nandii
Thereomyia seniorwhitei

Family: Sciaridae - Dark-winged fungus gnats
Odontosciara exacta

Family: Scathophagidae - Dung flies
Cordilura lineata
Cordilura pudica
Cordilura punctipes 
Parallelomma banski

Family: Scatopsidae - Dung midges
Colobostema metarhamphe
Colobostema occabipes
Psectrosciara brunnescens
Rhegmoclema hirtipenne
Scatopse brunnescens
Scatopse pilosa
Scatopse zeylanica

Family: Scenopinidae - Window flies
Scenopinus longiventris 
Scenopinus papuanus

Family: Sciaridae - Dark-winged fungus gnats
Apelmocreagris simulator

Family: Sciomyzidae - Marsh flies
Sepedon crishna 
Sepedon ferruginosa

Family: Sepsidae - Black scavenger flies
Perochaeta hennigi 
Sepsis thoracica
Toxopoda contracta

Family: Simuliidae - Black flies

Simulium bulla 
Simulium ceylonicum
Simulium cremnosi
Simulium cruszi
Simulium dola
Simulium ela
Simulium krombeini
Simulium languidum
Simulium nilgiricum 
Simulium nubis
Simulium paranubis
Simulium striatum
Simulium subpalmatum
Simulium trirugosum

Family: Sphaeroceridae - Lesser dung flies

Aspinilimonina postocellaris
Ceroptera equitans
Chaetopodella nigrinotum
Coproica ferrguinata
Coproica ferruginata
Coproica hirtula
Lotobia asiatica
Lotobia pallidiventris
Norrbomia marginatis
Norrbomia tropica 
Opacifrons brevisecunda
Opacifrons cederholmi 
Paralimosina ceylanica
Pellucialula polyseta
Poecilosomella aciculata
Poecilosomella affinis
Poecilosomella borboroides
Poecilosomella nigra
Poecilosomella pappi
Poecilosomella punctipennis
Poecilosomella varians
Rachispoda filiforceps
Rachispoda fuscipennis
Spinilimosina brevicostata
Trachyopella leucoptera

Family: Stratiomyidae - Soldier flies

Acrochaeta dimidiata
Adoxomyia heminopla
Allognosta annulifemur
Allognosta fuscitarsis
Ankylacantha keiseri - endemic genus
Argyrobrithes albopilosa
Atherigona lamda - endemic genus
Aulana confirmata
Beris javana
Cibotogaster azurea 
Clitellaria heminopla
Gabaza albiseta
Hermetia illucens 
Hermetia inflata 
Microchrysa flavicornis 
Microchrysa flaviventris 
Microchrysa vertebrata
Massicyta inflata
Nigritomyia ceylonica
Nigritomyia maculipennis
Odontomyia angustilimbata
Odontomyia cyanea
Odontomyia fascipes
Oplodontha minuta
Oplodontha punctifacies
Oplodontha rubrithorax
Oxycera whitei
Pachygaster transmarinus
Pegadomyia ceylonica
Prosopochrysa vitripennis
Ptecticus australis
Ptecticus cingulatus
Ptecticus pseudohistrio
Ptecticus srilankai 
Ptilocera fastuosa
Ptilocera fastuosa
Ptilocera smaragdifera
Ptilocera smaragdina
Sargus contractus
Sargus flaviventris 
Sargus gselli 
Sargus metallinus
Sargus splendidus
Stratiomys fenestrata 
Stratiomys minuta
Strophognathus argentatus - monotypic endemic genus
Tinda javana

Family: Streblidae - Streblid bat flies
Brachytarsina cucullata
Brachytarsina joblingi
Brachytarsina modesta 
Brachytarsina pygialis 
Brachytarsina speiseri 
Raymondia pagodarum
Speiserella lobulata

Family: Syrphidae - Hoverflies

Allobaccha amphithoe
Allobaccha fallax 
Allobaccha oldroydi
Allobaccha pulchrifrons 
Allobaccha triangulifera
Asarkina ayyari
Asarkina belli
Asarkina pitamara
Asarkina porcina
Betasyrphus fletcheri
Calcaretropidia triangulifera
Ceriana ornatifrons
Chrysogaster aerosa
Chrysogaster basalis
Chrysogaster hirtella
Chrysogaster incisa 
Chrysogaster insignis
Chrysogaster longicornis
Chrysogaster tarsata
Chrysotoxum baphyrus
Citrogramma henryi
Dasysyrphus orsua
Dideopsis aegrota
Dideopsis aegrota
Eosphaerophoria dentiscutellata
Episyrphus nubilipennis
Episyrphus viridaureus
Eristalinus arvorum
Eristalinus invirgulatus
Eristalinus lucilia
Eristalinus megacephalus
Eristalinus multifarius
Eristalinus paria
Eristalinus quadristriatus
Eristalis curvipes
Eumerus argentipes
Eumerus aurifrons
Eumerus coeruleifrons 
Eumerus figurans
Eumerus nicobarensis
Eumerus singhalensis
Eumerus sita
Graptomyza brevirostris
Graptomyza coomani
Helophilus curvigaster 
Indascia gracilis 
Mallota curvigaster
Mallota vilis
Melanostoma apicale
Melanostoma ceylonense
Melanostoma scalare
Meliscaeva ceylonica
Meliscaeva monticola
Microdon elisabeth 
Microdon fulvopubescens 
Microdon lanka 
Microdon montis 
Microdon taprobanicus 
Paragus auritus 
Paragus crenulatus 
Paragus rufocincta
Paragus yerburiensis
Phytomia errans
Pipizella rufocincta
Rhinobaccha gracilis
Simosyrphus grandicornis
Sphaerophoria indiana
Sphaerophoria macrogaster
Syritta proximata
Syritta triangulifera
Tropidia bambusifolia
Tropidia curculigoides
Tropidia septemnervis
Xanthandrus ceylonicus
Xanthogramma eoa
Xylota atroparva

Family: Tabanidae - Horseflies

Atylotus agrestis
Atylotus virgo
Chrysops dispar
Chrysops dubiens
Chrysops fasciatus
Chrysops fixissimus
Chrysops flaviventris
Chrysops flavocinctus
Chrysops srilankensis
Chrysops translucens
Cydistomyia brunnea
Cydistomyia ceylonicus
Cydistomyia laeta
Cydistomyia minor
Cydistomyia philipi
Cydistomyia pilipennis
Cydistomyia putea
Cydistomyia tibialis
Dichelacera tetradelta
Gastroxides ater
Gastroxides ornatus
Haematopota bequaerti 
Haematopota brevis 
Haematopota cingalensis 
Haematopota krombeini
Haematopota litoralis- subsp. rhizophorae 
Haematopota roralis 
Haematopota tessellata 
Haematopota unizonata 
Hybomitra minshanensis
Lissimodes ceylonicus 
Lissimodes minor 
Philoliche taprobanes
Philoliche zernyi
Silviomyza picea - monotypic endemic genus
Silvius ceylonicus 
Stenotabanus sphaeriscapus
Tabanus angustilimbatus
Tabanus atrohirtus
Tabanus brincki
Tabanus ceylonicus
Tabanus discrepans
Tabanus diversifrons
Tabanus dorsiger
Tabanus flavissimus 
Tabanus fuscicauda
Tabanus griseifacies 
Tabanus indiscriminatus
Tabanus inflatipalpis
Tabanus jucundus
Tabanus krombeini
Tabanus obconicus
Tabanus particolor
Tabanus pullus
Tabanus puteus 
Tabanus speciosus
Tabanus striatus
Tabanus tenens
Tabanus thellus
Tabanus tumidicallus
Tabanus wilpattuensis 
Udenocera brunnea - monotypic endemic genus

Family: Tachinidae - Tachina flies

Aneogmena fischeri 
Aneogmena rutherfordi
Aneogmena secunda
Argyrophylax franseni
Argyrophylax fransseni
Atractocerops ceylanicus
Austrophorocera grandis
Austrophorocera laetifica
Austrophorocera lucagus
Austrophorocera solennis
Blepharella lateralis
Blepharipa orbitalis
Blepharipa zebina 
Carcelia atripes
Carcelia bakeri
Carcelia caudata
Carcelia ceylanica 
Carcelia excisa
Carcelia latistylata
Carcelia rasoides
Carcelia subferrifera
Carcelia sumatrana
Chetogena bezziana
Clausicella molitor
Cylindromyia umbripennis 
Delta pyriforme
Dinera meridionalis
Doleschalla elongata
Drino curvipalpis 
Eutrixopsis paradoxa
Halydaia luteicornis
Hermya beelzebul 
Isosturmia intermedia
Isosturmia picta 
Medinodexia morgana
Nealsomyia rufella
Nealsomyia rufipes 
Paradrino laevicula
Phasia triangulata
Phorocera vagator
Prosena siberita
Prosheliomyia nietneri 
Rutilia rubriceps
Sisyropa formosa
Sisyropa heterusiae
Stevenia ceylanica
Sumpigaster flavipennis 
Thecocarcelia thrix
Thelaira macropus
Torocca fasciata  
Urodexia penicillum
Winthemia mallochi
Winthemia trichopareia 
Zenillia anomala
Zenillia nymphalidophaga

Family: Tephritidae - Fruit flies

Acanthiophilus astrophorus
Acinoeuphranta zeylanica
Acroceratitis striata
Actinoptera biseta
Actinoptera brahma
Actinoptera formosana
Adrama austeni  
Bactrocera apicofuscans
Bactrocera bipustulata
Bactrocera brunneola
Bactrocera caryeae
Bactrocera caudata
Bactrocera ceylanica 
Bactrocera correcta
Bactrocera cucurbitae
Bactrocera diaphora
Bactrocera diversa
Bactrocera dorsalis
Bactrocera duplicata
Bactrocera expandens
Bactrocera fastigata 
Bactrocera fernandoi 
Bactrocera garciniae
Bactrocera gavisa
Bactrocera hantanae
Bactrocera invadens 
Bactrocera kandiensis
Bactrocera latifrons
Bactrocera nigrofemoralis
Bactrocera nigrotibialis
Bactrocera perigrapha 
Bactrocera profunda
Bactrocera selenophora 
Bactrocera syzygii
Bactrocera tau 
Bactrocera trilineata
Bactrocera verbascifoliae 
Bactrocera versicolor
Bactrocera tau
Bactrocera invadens
Bactrocera verbascifoliae
Bactrocera zahadi
Campiglossa aeneostriata
Campiglossa agatha
Coelotrypes luteifasciata 
Dacus cliatus
Dacus discophorus
Dacus keiseri
Dacus longicornis 
Dacus nepalensis
Dacus persicus
Dacus ramanii 
Dioxyna picciola 
Elaphromyia siva
Euphranta conjuncta
Euphranta zeylanica 
Galbifascia quadripunctata
Goniurellia persignata 
Hexacinia radiosa
Meracanthomyia gamma
Metasphenisca reinhardi 
Oxyaciura monochaeta
Oxyaciura xanthotricha 
Platensina acrostacta
Platensina zodiacalis
Pliomelaena translucida 
Rhabdochaeta pulchella
Rhochmopterum seniorwhitei
Rioxa discalis
Rioxa lanceolata
Rioxa parvipunctata 
Scedella orientalis
Scedella spiloptera
Sophiroides flammosa
Spathulina acroleuca
Sphaeniscus melanotrichotus
Sphaeniscus quadrincisus
Sphenella sinensis 
Tephraciura basimacula
Tritaeniopteron punctatipleurum
Trupanea amoena
Trupanea aucta 
Xarnuta leucotela

Family: Therevidae - Stiletto flies
Irwiniella ceylonica
Irwiniella sequa
Megapalla curvata
Phycus brunneus
Phycus frommeri
Phycus hauseri
Phycus minutus
Schoutedenomyia argentiventris

Family: Tipulidae - Crane flies
Holorusia ochripes
Indotipula demarcata
Indotipula palnica
Indotipula singhalica
Leptotarsus errans
Leptotarsus zeylanica
Nephrotoma javensis
Nephrotoma pleurinotata
Prionota serraticornis
Pselliophora henryi
Pselliophora laeta - subsp. laeta, strigidorsum
Pselliophora taprobanes
Tipula hampsoni
Tipulodina brunettiella
Tipulodina ceylonica
Tipulodina gracillima

Family: Ulidiidae - picture-winged flies
Physiphora clausa 
Physiphora longicornis

Family: Xylomyidae - Wood soldier flies
Solva inamoena

Family: Xylophagidae - Awl-flies
Rachicerus aterrimus
Rachicerus bicolor
Rachicerus rusticus
Rachicerus spissus
Xylophagus brunneus

Notes

References

Sri Lanka